Glen Vernon (born Glenn Vernon; October 27, 1923 – October 27, 1999) was an American actor.

Glenn Vernon hailed from Fall River, Massachusetts, and pursued a dramatic career upon graduation from high school. He used his given name of Glenn Vernon until 1950, when he adopted "Glen Vernon" as his professional name.

By 1944 he was established as a Broadway juvenile, and he was recruited by RKO Radio Pictures to play a sensitive Russian soldier in the film Days of Glory. Signed to a term contract, Vernon went on to play featured roles in dramas, comedies, and musicals, among them Youth Runs Wild, Step Lively,Those Endearing Young Charms, Bedlam, Riverboat Rhythm, and The Woman on the Beach.

The RKO studio often offered its own version of another studio's popular property. When Universal Pictures had Abbott and Costello, RKO's answer was Brown and Carney. In the musical-comedy field, Universal had Donald O'Connor and Peggy Ryan while Metro-Goldwyn-Mayer had Mickey Rooney and Judy Garland. RKO teamed its popular young players Glenn Vernon and Marcy McGuire. This pairing resulted in two features, the second being Glenn Vernon's only leading role: a hapless jazz clarinetist who can't read music, in the Hollywood-themed feature Ding Dong Williams (filmed in 1945). After McGuire angrily petitioned her bosses for her own starring vehicles, RKO released her from the payroll and dissolved the Vernon-McGuire series. RKO waited for almost a year for the public to forget the Vernon-McGuire team, and finally released Ding Dong Williams in the spring of 1946. Vernon recruited his Broadway co-star Joan Newton to replace McGuire in Riverboat Rhythm.

When tycoon Howard Hughes bought the RKO studio, many of the resident contract players were dismissed; Vernon left the studio in 1947. He returned to the stage, playing in Los Angeles-area productions. He resumed his screen career as a freelance actor, mostly for the independent studios Republic, Monogram, and Lippert. In 1950, now billed as "Glen Vernon," he was a song-and-dance man in the vaudeville revue Hollywood Varieties and played a drunken wastrel in Lucky Losers with The Bowery Boys. His movie career never regained its wartime momentum, but he continued to play small roles in motion pictures and television. One of his fellow players from Ding Dong Williams, Tommy Noonan, remembered Vernon's calm screen demeanor and cast him as an Army chaplain in his 1959 production The Rookie. On television, he portrayed a bellboy in the 1961 episode ""The Big Spender" of the television series Window on Main Street, starring Robert Young.

In the 1980s and 1990s, Vernon was cast as quaint old men, in films (So I Married an Axe Murderer) and television (Doogie Howser, M.D.,The Golden Girls).

Today's audiences may recognize Glenn Vernon from a movie he never actually made: near the beginning of the famous RKO feature It's a Wonderful Life, when the bereaved pharmacist Mr. Gower gazes at a picture of his deceased son, it's a photo of Glenn Vernon.

Death
Vernon died on October 27, 1999, in Woodland Hills, Los Angeles, from complications of a stroke. He was 76 years old.

Filmography

References

External links
 

1923 births
1999 deaths
American male film actors
20th-century American male actors
People from Fall River, Massachusetts
RKO Pictures contract players